The Dark Ground of Spirit: Schelling and the Unconscious is a 2012 book by the philosopher Sean J. McGrath, in which the author examines how the psychoanalytical concept of the unconscious originates in German Idealism, especially the work of the German philosopher, Friedrich Wilhelm Joseph Schelling.

Reception
The Dark Ground of Spirit has been reviewed by David Tacey, Benjamin Burger and J. A. F. Marshall.

References 

2011 non-fiction books
Books about Sigmund Freud
Books by Sean McGrath
English-language books
Routledge books
Works about Friedrich Wilhelm Joseph Schelling
Books about philosophy of psychology